Hailee Steinfeld (born December 11, 1996) is an American actress and singer. She is the recipient of various accolades, including a Critics' Choice Movie Award, a Peabody Award and a Billboard Music Award. She has also garnered nominations for an Academy Award, a British Academy Film Award, a Golden Globe Award and a Screen Actors Guild Award.

Steinfeld had her breakthrough with the western film True Grit (2010), which earned her nominations for the Academy Award for Best Supporting Actress and the BAFTA Award for Best Actress in a Leading Role. Following appearances in Ender's Game and Begin Again (both 2013), she gained wider recognition for her roles in the Pitch Perfect film series (2015–2017) and the coming-of-age film The Edge of Seventeen (2016), the latter of which earned her a Golden Globe nomination. Her highest-grossing release came with the Transformers film Bumblebee (2018).

Steinfeld has voiced multiple animated characters including Gwen Stacy / Spider-Woman in the Spider-Verse franchise, most recently in Spider-Man: Into the Spider-Verse (2018), and Vi in the Netflix series Arcane (2021–present). In television, she portrayed Emily Dickinson in the Apple TV+ comedy-drama series Dickinson (2019–2021), and Kate Bishop in the Disney+ series Hawkeye (2021).

Steinfeld gained recognition in music after performing "Flashlight" in Pitch Perfect 2 (2015). She signed with Republic Records soon after and released her debut single, "Love Myself", followed by her debut EP Haiz (2015). She went on to release a series of successful singles, including "Starving", "Most Girls" and "Let Me Go". In 2020, she released her second EP, Half Written Story.

Early life
Steinfeld was born in the Tarzana neighborhood of Los Angeles, California, the younger of two children of Cheri (née Domasin), an interior designer, and Peter Steinfeld, a personal trainer. She has an older brother, Griffin. Her paternal uncle is fitness trainer and actor Jake Steinfeld, and her maternal great uncle is former child actor Larry Domasin. Her maternal first cousin, actress True O'Brien, appeared in a television commercial when Steinfeld was eight years old, inspiring her to try acting as well. 

Steinfeld's father is Jewish and her mother is Christian. Her maternal grandfather, Ricardo Domasin, was half Filipino (from Panglao, Bohol) and half African-American. Steinfeld was raised in Agoura Hills and later in Thousand Oaks, California, attending Ascension Lutheran School, Conejo Elementary and Colina Middle School. She was home-schooled from 2008 until her high school graduation in June 2015.

Career

2007–2015: Breakthrough and critical recognition

Steinfeld began acting at the age of 10; she appeared in several short films, including playing the role of Talia Alden in the award-winning She's a Fox. Steinfeld was chosen for the role of Mattie Ross in True Grit when she was 13. The film was released internationally in December 2010; Richard Corliss of Time magazine called her performance one of the Top 10 of 2010, and wrote that Steinfeld "delivers the orotund dialogue as if it were the easiest vernacular, stares down bad guys, wins hearts. That's a true gift". Reviews from Roger Ebert, the Los Angeles Times, and Rolling Stone were also complimentary. The role earned Steinfeld a nomination at the 83rd Academy Awards for an Academy Award for Best Supporting Actress; it went to Melissa Leo. In May 2011, five months after True Grit was released, she was chosen to be the new face of Italian designer brand Miu Miu.

In 2011, Steinfeld was cast at age 14 to play Juliet in a 2013 adaptation of Romeo and Juliet. The role was originally intended for a 22-year-old actress; there was concern about nudity in the film, but its director explained that when Steinfeld was cast, the script was changed to make it age-appropriate. The film was released in October 2013 to poor reviews in the United States and internationally. Steinfeld starred as Petra Arkanian in Ender's Game, a science-fiction action-adventure film based on the book by Orson Scott Card. The film was released on November 1, 2013.

Steinfeld played Violet, one of the leads in the romance-drama Begin Again. The film was given a limited release in the United States on June 27, 2014, grossing $134,064 on its opening weekend; it opened in wide release on July 11. It was re-released by The Weinstein Company on August 29. Paramount Pictures closed a deal in 2011 for the screen rights to the Cat Patrick novel Forgotten and announced that she would play London Lane in a project yet to be filmed . In 2014, Steinfeld was announced to star as Min Green in a screen adaptation of Daniel Handler's romantic-comedy book Why We Broke Up, but as of 2022, the film had not gone into production.

Steinfeld was cast as Eliza opposite Ender's Game co-star Asa Butterfield in the film adaptation of Ten Thousand Saints, which premiered on January 23, 2015, at the 2015 Sundance Film Festival. Steinfeld was originally cast to play the female lead in the 2015 film, For the Dogs, but was replaced by actress Emma Roberts. In spring 2014, Steinfeld narrated as the voice of Anne Frank for an exhibition on Frank at the Museum of Tolerance. In October, she was cast to star as Hadley in The Statistical Probability of Love at First Sight, based on the novel of the same name by Jennifer E. Smith. But that film was not yet made as of early 2022. Steinfeld was announced in January 2015 as the star of the film adaptation of Carrie Pilby, the young adult novel by Caren Lissner; she left the project due to scheduling conflicts. In March, Steinfeld was one of the voice actors for the English-language dub of the Japanese animated film When Marnie Was There. Steinfeld plays Anna Sasaki alongside Kiernan Shipka as Marnie. In April 2015, Steinfeld was cast in a lead role in Break My Heart 1000 Times, based on the YA novel by Daniel Waters. Scott Speer was set to direct, but the film has not been made as of 2022.

Steinfeld starred as the Trinity in the music video for "Bad Blood" by Taylor Swift featuring Kendrick Lamar. The video premiered at the 2015 Billboard Music Awards ceremony on May 17, 2015, and won a MTV Video Music Award for Video of the Year. Steinfeld starred in limited-release movie Barely Lethal. The movie was directed by Kyle Newman and was released on May 29, 2015. Steinfeld co-starred in Pitch Perfect 2, alongside Anna Kendrick, Rebel Wilson, and Elizabeth Banks, who also directed. She played some of her songs for a representative from Republic Records at an event in New York City, and the label signed her. In May, Republic Records announced the record deal and that Steinfeld was working on her first release.

2015–2018: Established actress, Haiz and other music endeavors

In July 2015, Steinfeld and singer Shawn Mendes released an acoustic version of Mendes' single, "Stitches". The following month, Steinfeld released her debut single, "Love Myself", with Republic Records. The song garnered media attention for its empowering message as well as suggestive lyrics that led media outlets to dub the song an "ode to masturbation".

Steinfeld's debut extended play, Haiz (a nickname used by her fans), was released in November 2015. Haiz was produced by Mattman & Robin and features co-writers Julia Michaels and Justin Tranter. The EP was released to generally positive reviews. In February 2016, Steinfeld released a remixed version of "Rock Bottom", as the second single featuring American funk pop band DNCE. Steinfeld's next single, "Starving", was released in July 2016 to critical acclaim. The song is a collaboration with Grey featuring Zedd and became her biggest hit to date going platinum in Italy, New Zealand, Sweden, United Kingdom and the United States, while also going double platinum in Australia and triple platinum in Canada.

In September 2016, Steinfeld played the lead role in The Edge of Seventeen, a coming-of-age comedy co-starring Blake Jenner, Woody Harrelson and Kyra Sedgwick, and written and directed by Kelly Fremon Craig. The film was released on November 18, 2016, to positive reviews; Steinfeld's performance was praised and earned her a Golden Globe Award nomination.

Early 2017, Steinfeld featured on two songs: "Show You Love" and "Digital Love". In March, Steinfeld was featured on American rapper Machine Gun Kelly's single "At My Best" taken from his third studio album Bloom. A month later, Steinfeld released her next single "Most Girls". The song received positive reviews and peaked at number 58 on the Billboard Hot 100 chart in the United States. Steinfeld performed the song live for the first time at the 2017 Radio Disney Music Awards on April 29. A music video was released and received praise for its message of embracing individuality but also drew some criticism for its lack of diversity. Steinfeld also reprised her role as Emily Junk in Pitch Perfect 3 (2017).  In September 2017, Steinfeld released the single "Let Me Go", a collaboration with Swedish record producer Alesso featuring Florida Georgia Line and Andrew Watt, which reached number 14 on the Mainstream Top 40 chart. That same month she featured on the remix of "Plot Twist" by Marc E. Bassy.

On January 12, 2018, Steinfeld released "Capital Letters" for the soundtrack to the film Fifty Shades Freed. The song was received with positive reviews and peaked at number 12 on the Bubbling Under Hot 100 Singles chart. In March 2018, Steinfeld revealed that she is "wrapping up" work on her debut studio album. She performed at Indonesian Choice Awards in Jakarta, Indonesia the next month. Steinfeld then featured the song "Colour" with MNEK on June 1. In September, she was featured on Logic's album, YSIV, on the song "Ordinary Day" and on Chic's album, It's About Time on the song "Dance with Me".

In late 2018, Steinfeld starred in the Transformers spin-off film Bumblebee, and provided the voice of Gwen Stacy/Spider-Woman in the Academy Award-winning animated film Spider-Man: Into the Spider-Verse. In November, her song "Back to Life" was released as a single from the Bumblebee soundtrack. This marked the first time Steinfeld released a song for a film she starred in, save her work in Pitch Perfect. That same month, hosted and performed at 2018 MTV Europe Music Awards in Bilbao, Spain.

2019–present: Half Written Story and continued acclaim

In January 2019, Steinfeld featured on the remix of "Woke Up Late" by Drax Project. In August 2019, Steinfeld featured on the music video for Benny Blanco and Juice Wrld's single "Graduation". She also appeared in a cameo as one of the recruited Angels in the 2019 film Charlie's Angels, and also made an appearance on Between Two Ferns: The Movie.

In December 2018, Steinfeld was cast to star as Emily Dickinson in the Apple TV+ period comedy series Dickinson. The show aired on November 1, 2019. To promote the show, Steinfeld released "Afterlife" which featured on the show's first season finale. The show went for three seasons. In 2020, Steinfeld won a Peabody Award, making Dickinson the first show from Apple TV+ to win the prestigious honor.

Steinfeld released two singles in 2020, "Wrong Direction" and "I Love You's". The tracks acted as the first and second singles, respectively, from her EP Half Written Story, which was released on May 8, 2020. The EP received mixed reviews with critics praising Steinfeld's vocals, confidence and vulnerability but panning the music. On May 28, 2020, Steinfeld released a single with Taiwanese singer, Chen Linong, titled "Masterpiece".

In December 2020, Steinfeld was cast as Kate Bishop / Hawkeye in the Disney+ Marvel Cinematic Universe series Hawkeye. The show premiered on November 24, 2021, and consisted of six episodes. Her role received positive reviews from critics. Steinfeld is set to reprise the role in future films, noting that she has signed a multi-project deal. Steinfeld also voiced Violet "Vi" in the adult animated show Arcane which was released on November 20, 2021. The show is set in the League of Legends universe.

In April 2022, Steinfeld teased a song titled "Coast". Marking two years since she last released music, "Coast" was released on July 28, 2022, and was a "a euphoric, guitar-and-percussion-driven single", featuring American rapper Anderson .Paak. A music video premiered on Facebook on November 9, 2022. An acoustic version was released on December 7, 2022.

Upcoming projects
In 2023 and 2024, Steinfeld is set to reprise her voice role as Gwen Stacy/Spider-Gwen in Spider-Man: Across the Spider-Verse and its sequel, Spider-Man: Beyond the Spider-Verse. A second season of Arcane was also announced.

Artistry and media reception

Musical and acting styles

V magazine writer Dylan Kelly called Steinfeld an "artist of ambidexterity, showcasing supremacy across an impressive repertoire of on-screen roles in film and television", and said "her musical prowess is one of melodic self-growth and good-natured, lyrical wisdom". 

Steinfeld said in a 2016 interview, "With [my] music, I feel like I get to be myself, tell my own story, and take my life experiences and not put them into another story but into my own words." She went on to say that "music is such a big influence in [her] acting" and that the two "entwine". Variety writer Natalie Weiner stated that Steinfeld has long been injecting "some vague notion of female empowerment [...] into her music. Self-love is a common theme Steinfeld has looked at within her music.

Steinfeld has stated that she hopes to be remembered as "an artist that truly cared about the art". She went on to note the "differences between working on a film set and in a studio are multiple", and adding that "she loves the freedom of making music". 
There's something so freeing about going into a studio. It doesn't matter what time of day it is, doesn't matter what you're wearing or whether you're wearing make-up or not. You go into a room with people that you love and you feel comfortable with, and can be yourself around and be vulnerable and open up and talk about experiences. Magic happens in those moments.

Influences
Steinfeld has cited Madonna and Rihanna as her biggest musical influences. Other artists Steinfeld has cited as influences include Britney Spears, Tori Kelly, Selena Gomez, Bruno Mars and Justin Timberlake. Steinfeld noted their "strength, courage and their ability to go out [...] and express themselves". She has also said that she grew up listening to Boyz II Men and Luther Vandross due to her mother's love for them.

Achievements

In 2011, Steinfeld was nominated for an Academy Award for Best Supporting Actress for her performance in the 2010 film True Grit, making her one of the youngest actresses to be nominated in the category. She also received nominations for a BAFTA Award for Best Actress, a SAG Award and a Critics' Choice Movie Award for Best Supporting Actress for the same film. In 2016, she was nominated for a Golden Globe Award for Best Actress for The Edge of Seventeen.

Steinfeld has also won awards for her music, including a 2017 Billboard Music Award for Top Covered Artist for her song "Most Girls". Her 2015 single "Love Myself" debuted on the Billboard Pop Songs chart at number 27 (later peaking at 15), marking the highest debut for a solo female artist on the chart in 17 years, since Natalie Imbruglia's "Torn" in 1998. The song went on to be certified two times platinum by the Recording Industry Association of America (RIAA). In 2020, "Most Girls" and Steinfeld's collaboration, with Grey and Zedd titled "Starving", were certified two and four times platinum, respectively, by the RIAA.

Personal life
Steinfeld started dating Instagrammer Cameron Smoller in 2016. They made their public debut as a couple at a Golden Globes party in early 2017 but broke up in November 2017. She started dating Irish singer Niall Horan in December 2017. The two broke up a year later in December 2018.

Other ventures

Endorsements 
Outside of her projects in the acting and music industry, Steinfeld has embarked on other ventures. She has been involved in marketing initiatives throughout her career and endorsed numerous brands including Prada, Balmain, and Louis Vuitton. In 2017, Steinfeld began to represent Reef Footwear and MISSION Activewear. In 2018, her line of eyewear called Privé Revaux was launched. In 2022, Steinfeld released "Coast" which coincided with the promotion of her newest role as a brand ambassador for CORE Hydration, promoting the company's "Find Your Core" campaign.

Philanthropy 
Steinfeld endorsed a variety of charities, including numerous organizations with a focus on improving children's lives. The list of charities endorsed by her includes: "What's Your Mission?", a charitable initiative with mission apparel and an accessories brand, "No Kid Hungry", a charity working to eradicate child hunger in the United States, WE Movement, The Ryan Seacrest Foundation, Make-A-Wish Foundation, and others. On the set of True Grit, Steinfeld created a "swear jar"; every time someone uttered the word "fuck", Steinfeld would collect $5 from the perpetrator, while other vulgarities were worth a dollar. As a trade-off, she had to pay up 50 cents if she said "like". She stated she "matched it and donated it all to an Alzheimer's foundation".

Steinfeld has made several public appearances during charity events, such as the Breast Cancer Foundation's 2014 Hot Pink Party, the iHeartRadio Jingle Ball 2015 tour, and WE Day 2019 in California. In 2016, Steinfeld participated in singing "Santa Claus Is Coming to Town" with fellow singers and celebrities. The single raised money to aid New York City's homeless during the holiday season through "Robin Hood", a New York City organization that focuses on fighting poverty.

Steinfeld alongside the cast of the Pitch Perfect film series reunited to record an a cappella cover of Beyonce's track "Love On Top", which was released in August 2020. The proceeds from the song went to Unicef to help children in Lebanon and around the world.

Filmography

Film

Television

Discography

Tours
Opening act
 Meghan Trainor – The Untouchable Tour (2016)
 Katy Perry – Witness: The Tour (2018)
 Charlie Puth – Voicenotes Tour (2018)

Festivals (various artists)
 Jingle Ball Tour 2015 (2015)
 Jingle Ball Tour 2016 (2016)

See also
 List of oldest and youngest Academy Award winners and nominees

References

External links

 
 
 

 
1996 births
21st-century American actresses
21st-century African-American women singers
Actresses from California
Actresses from Los Angeles
African-American actresses
American actresses of Filipino descent
American child actresses
American contemporary R&B singers
American women pop singers
American film actresses
American musicians of Filipino descent
American television actresses
American voice actresses
Dance-pop musicians
Jewish American actresses
Jewish American musicians
Jewish singers
Living people
People from Tarzana, Los Angeles
People from Thousand Oaks, California
African-American Jews
Singers from Los Angeles